The Traveler is the seventh album, and sixth studio album, by Old 97's front man Rhett Miller. It was released in 2015, and was recorded with the band Black Prairie.

Track listing 
All songs written by Rhett Miller.
 Wanderlust - 3:17
 Jules - 4:06
 Most In The Summertime - 4:44
 My Little Disaster - 4:28
 Fair Enough - 3:43
 Kiss Me On The Fire Escape - 2:57
 Lucky Star - 3:27
 Escape Velocity - 3:14
 Dreams Vs. Waking Life - 5:41
 Wicked Things - 3:11
 Good Night - 4:12
 Reasons To Live - 3:23

References

2015 albums
Rhett Miller albums